King Fahad Specialist Hospital-Dammam  (KFSHD) is a hospital in the Eastern region of Saudi Arabia.

Introduction 
King Fahad Specialist Hospital-Dammam (KFSH-D) is a tertiary care referral hospital that serves the Eastern Province and the Gulf population. Core Competencies include: Oncology, Multi-Organ Transplant, Neurosciences and Cardiology. The hospital also offers subspecialty services in Hematology, Rehabilitation, Nuclear Medicine, Radiotherapy, and Urology. 

KFSH-D serves around 300,000 outpatients and 10,000 inpatients each year by medical and clinical staff from different nationalities.

Location 
King Fahad Hospital-Dammam is located in the Eastern Region of Saudi Arabia, Dammam City, Al Murekbat area, Omar Bin Thabet Street.

Scope of Service and Accreditation 
KFSH-D provides tertiary specialty health care services mainly to the population of the Eastern Region in the Kingdom of Saudi Arabia. Patient referral is usually initiated by secondary care hospitals. Self-referral for tertiary medical care can be processed and accepted in limited cases.

AACME 
The Academic Affairs gained the American Academy of Continuing Medical Education (AACME) accreditation to become the first MOH hospital in Saudi Arabia. KFSH-D was awarded the AACME accreditation in September. This is reportedly an international, independent voluntary accreditation organization, and is not affiliated with the Accreditation Council for Continuing Medical Education (ACCME).

History 

 1984 - Construction of KFSH-D began
 1999 - Construction was completed
 2005 - The hospital was initially named “Gulf Hospital” then renamed as “King Fahad Specialist Hospital-Dammam” by a Royal Decree. It was opened in the reign of the Custodian of the Two Holy Mosques King Fahd bin Abdulaziz, may God have mercy on him, and it was inaugurated and dedicated to public service by King Abdullah Bin Abdulaziz Al Saud while he was still the crown prince
 2008 - KFSH-D started to serve as a tertiary referral hospital offering specialized medical care 
 2018 - Based on a Ministerial Decree, KFSH-D became part of the Eastern Province First Health Cluster, which was formed in alignment with the National Transformation Program (NTP) and Vision 2030

Goals, Values and Objectives

Mission Statement 
To provide compassionate quality healthcare, integrated with education and research.

Vision Statement 
To be the leading center of excellence in specialized healthcare.

Values 
Collaboration, Accountability, Compassion, Commitment, Integrity.

KFSH-D Core Competencies
One of the latest achievements of KFSH-D is the establishment of the Stem Cell Transplant Service that performed more than 50 Adult and Pediatric Transplants by the end of 2012. KFSH-D is the only center amongst the Ministry of Health hospitals in Saudi Arabia that provides this highly specialized service.
 Multi Organ Transplant Center (MOTC) of KFSH-D was established in 2008 to cover the need for organ transplantations in the Eastern Province and the kingdom. The MOTC continued to expand since the first kidney transplant in September 2008 to meet the growing needs. King Fahad Specialist Hospital-Dammam continues to work closely with the Saudi Center for Organ Transplantation (SCOT), the Eastern Province health authorities, and the other hospitals in GCC countries. 
Services
 Kidney transplant for adult and pediatric patients from living and deceased donors
Liver transplant for adult and pediatric patients from living and deceased donors
 Pancreases Transplant
Major distinctive surgeries
 Kidney paired exchange transplant
 Domino liver transplant
 Kidney & liver transplant for small size recipients 
 Spontaneous Kidney Pancreas Transplant
 Kidney & liver transplant (on the same time)
 Kidney Auto transplant
 Split liver transplantation
 En-bloc kidney transplant
 Liver transplant for Acute fulminant liver failure patients
 Laparoscopic nephrectomy for living donors
 Complex anatomy transplant
 Oncology Center 
 Adult Medical Oncology Department
 General Description
 The mission of Adult Medical Oncology Department in King Fahd Specialist Hospital is to provide state-of-the-art Cancer Care since 2005. The field of medical oncology in King Fahd Specialist Hospital-Dammam has undergone a significant evolution in the last few years. In this era of individualized medicine, we succeeded to introduce new ways to tailor treatment based on the molecular pathways of the tumor. In this way the department has established standard molecular biologic markers testing for solid tumors that help treatment individualization (Oncotype-DX, HER2-neu, RAS family, Alk, BRAF, C-myc, BRCA 1&2, EGFR, ROS1, MSI, PDL-1, EGFR T790M), In addition to the ability to develop a disease-focused outpatient clinics and a disease-focused chemotherapy clinics are under process.
 In the era of Immunotherapy which is the most promising new cancer treatment of the last years, immunotherapy treatment is currently available for our patients, in addition to CDK4/6 inhibitors.
 There has never been a more exciting time to be in the field of oncology in King Fahd Specialist Hospital Dammam, especially in academic oncology as the department has developed Saudi Medical Oncology Fellowship Program since 2010 to have finest oncologists for the future needs of the MOH and Kingdom, eleven candidates already graduated and another four joined the program this year.
 The department has started Medical Oncology Outreach Program effectively in Feb 2015 in response to the King Fahd Specialist Hospital-Dammam strategic planning goals. This program aims to deliver cancer care to cancer patients in a convenient access in their local areas while maintaining KFSH-D standard of safety and quality. The outreach clinics operate daily based clinic in Al Ahsa and weekly clinic in Hafar al-Batin Central Hospital.
To make distinct and groundbreaking contributions to patient care, the department involved in national and international clinical research trials.
 Adult Hematology-Oncology and HSCT Department
 General Description
 The department provides specialized services for the whole Eastern Province. The range of patients accepted and treated at the department include:
 Hemato-oncology: acute leukemias, chronic leukemias, multiple myeloma and other plasma cells disorders, chronic myeloproliferative neoplasms, and   lymphomas:  Hodgkin and non-Hodgkin types
 Bone marrow failure syndromes:  aplastic anemia, myelodysplastic syndromes and hereditary bone marrow failure syndromes.
 High dose chemotherapy and stem cells rescue [autologous transplantation] for: myeloma, lymphoma, acute myeloid leukemia]
 Allogeneic hematopoietic stem cell transplantation (HSCT) for: acute and chronic leukemias, bone marrow failure syndromes and relapsed /refractory Multiple myeloma and Lymphoma
 Microangiopathic hemolytic anemias
 Consultation Services for
 Hemoglobinpathy.
 Refractory idiopathic thrombocytopenic purpura.
 Hemolytic anemias.
 Cytopenias.
 Thromboembolic disorders and cancer-related thrombosis.
  Therapy-related thrombocytopenia including Heparin-induced thrombocytopenia.
  Refractory idiopathic thrombocytopenic purpura and other platelets disorder (eg Glanzman’s   thrombathenia).
 Pediatric Hematology-Oncology and HSCT Department
 General Description
 The Department of Pediatric Hematology Oncology and Stem Cell Transplant offers tertiary care services for children with cancer and blood disorders. Therapeutic-wise, department provides chemotherapy, immunotherapy and cellular therapy to cancer patients, benign hematology disorders, metabolic and immunodeficiency diseases. All diagnostic, supportive and surgical services are provided as well. Eligible patients must be 16 years or younger.
 Services Provided
 Treatment of Malignant Solid Tumors.
 Treatment of Malignant Brain Tumors.
 Treatment of Malignant Lymphomas.
 Treatment of Malignant Blood Diseases such as Leukemia and MDS.
 Hematopoietic Stem Cell Transplant (HSCT) for malignant diseases and for Benign Hematology such as thalassemia, sickle cell disease, HLH, inherited and acquired bone marrow failures, genetic, metabolic and immunodeficiency diseases 
 Achievements
 Transplantation of 23 cases during 2020, 40% allogeneic and 60% autologous.
 Establishment of HSCT for HLH as new BMT eligibility in KFSHD, 2 cases were transplanted.
 Continuation of Pediatric Neuro-Oncology Program.
 Reaccreditation of pediatric hematology and oncology fellowship training program and converting the same program from partial to complete program.
 Continuation of all supportive services including academic education, social, spiritual and psychological support and entertainment programs.
 Development of a detailed data collection tool with >30 entries, in collaboration with the Decision Support Department, to accurately capture patient statistics and workload statistics for physicians and nurses in the Pediatric Oncology Day Care Area.
 Acceptance and treatment of 160 new patients during 2020 with a 25% increment compering to 2019.
 Over coming all the barriers that rose dung covid19 lockdown period.
 Radiation Oncology Department
 General Description
 The Radiation Oncology department at King Fahad Specialist Hospital – Dammam is the only such facility under the Ministry of Health in the entire Eastern Province that provides the most comprehensive radiotherapy services to the population of this region and referral patients from other areas as well.
 The department is equipped with two Varian TrueBeam™ linear accelerators, a high-dose rate Varian GammaMed plus™ brachytherapy unit, a GE RT-Discovery CT-Simulator and a LIAC™ Intraoperative radiation therapy “IORT” machine from SIT Sordina. Every treatment delivery passes through a strict, extensive quality control processes. The department operates in a completely paperless environment under ARIA® oncology management system.
 The department consists of multiple teams working in harmony to provide the best care for our patients. The teams are composed of: physicians, physicists, dosimetrists, therapists, nurses and administrators. Our staff members are trained in pioneer centers worldwide and certified by the most prestigious organizations.   
 The department is committed to provide state-of-the-art radiation oncology modalities, fusing the latest technology with the best international standard in clinical practice, in congruence with the mission and vision objectives of our hospital.
 Palliative Care Department
 General Description
 Palliative care is a comprehensive, interdisciplinary approach that improves the quality of life of patients and their families facing the problems associated with life-threatening illnesses, through the prevention and relief of suffering by means of early identification and impeccable assessment and treatment of pain and other problems, physical, psychosocial and spiritual. 
 At KFSHD, the palliative medicine interprofessional team works closely with oncology center patients, to offer integrated supportive services throughout the spectrum of their illness. Special focus is geared towards the end-of-life, to make sure patients’ and caregivers’ needs are attended to. Care offered goes beyond patients’ lives to extend bereavement support to caregivers after the loss of their loved ones. 
 Services provided
 Palliative care services are offered at different settings:
 Consultation services: offered upon the request of other specialty providers to assist in pain and symptom management. Consultations are answered 24/7 based on needs and urgency
 Outpatient clinic: accepts ambulatory patients for the management of bothersome symptoms. In addition, outreach palliative care clinics have been established at remote locations based on oncology center patients’ needs. Outpatient consultations and follow-ups are offered virtually when appropriate.
 Inpatient palliative care unit: reserved for patients with intense symptom crisis, requiring rigorous medical attention and continuous nursing care 
 Home/community hospice: offering visits to patients who are home-bound, to provide comprehensive medical care at the comfort of their homes. Advanced symptom management is offered at home including use of Patient-controlled analgesia pumps
 Helpline services: 24/7 helpline services are offered for patients and caregivers to give them access to clinical advice after hours. The helpline is operated by clinical care nurse coordinators who are experienced in palliative medicine, with the support of the palliative medicine physician on-call. 
 Training
 Palliative medicine fellowship training program: the department offers a two-year training program that is accredited by the Saudi Council for Health Specialists. This is the only training program for palliative medicine in the Eastern Province. It accepts two candidates per year, to experience a wide range of palliative care training opportunities at the hospital’s ESMO Designated Center for Integrated Oncology and Palliative Care since 2019.
 Residents from different specialties also join the department of palliative medicine for clinical rotations year long. In addition, the department organizes a number of training courses and activities for continuing medical education.
Scope of services
 Solid tumors
 Blood malignancies
 Bone marrow and stem cell therapy for blood and solid malignancies as well as for bone marrow failures and complicated congenital anemia
 The Oncology Center offers multidisciplinary care programs including conventional and advanced oncology therapeutic methods such as chemotherapy, radiation therapy, total body irradiation, oncology surgery, bone marrow transplant, autologous or allogenic target cell therapy, and immunotherapy.  In addition, the Radiation Therapy Department is developing a very sophisticated technique of Intraoperative Radiation Therapy (IORT).
 Neurosciences Center 
 The Neurosciences Center was founded in 2011 with the concept of including all specialties relating to the nervous system under one umbrella. The center’s vision is to be recognized as a center of excellence in the field of Neuroscience. Its Mission is to provide the highest quality of patient care, research, and education in specialized areas of Neuroscience Center.
 Neurosurgery Department
 Spine Department
 Neurology Department
 Pediatric Neurology Department
 Mental Health Department
 Physical Medicine and Rehabilitation Department
 Clinical Neurophysiology Department
 Our main focus is in developing and enriching highly specialized multidisciplinary clinical programs that go side-by-side with full integration with research and training. Such as:
 The comprehensive epilepsy program
	The complex spine program
	The multiple sclerosis and autoimmune neurology program
	The neuromuscular program
	The Neuro-oncology program
	The Neurovascular Program
4. Cardiac Center
 Cardiology service (adult & pediatric) plays an integral role at King Fahad Specialist Hospital – Dammam (KFSHD). It provides all cardiac testing and services supporting all other departments and sections in the hospital; especially patient from Multi-Organ Transplant Center (MOTC), Oncology Center and department of surgery. Through close relationship with other departments and sections, cardiac services were expanded exponentially, with all effort and perseverance to maintain quality and optimal services; providing care and treatment to patients, increasing educational and teaching activities to students, residents and staff physicians, and developing and launching clinical students.
 Services to Adults and Pediatrics include in-patient care as well as procedures in electrocardiography, cardiac stress tests and echocardiography. There is also a section of electrocardiography that includes elective cardioversion, temporary pacemaker implantation and arrhythmia evaluation and management.
 The cardiac center has established cardiac care unit (CCU) that provides advance cardiac care for critically ill patients. The cardiac center also has a well-structured and equipped noninvasive cardiac laboratory where a variety of test and procedure can be performed such as 3D echocardiography, transesophageal echocardiography (TEE), nuclear testing for cardiac disease and extended monitoring system for cardiac arrhythmia.

Awards 
The hospital has been awarded a number of certifications and accreditations and has been maintaining them every year since 2010. The KFSH-D was granted the Magnet Recognition by the American Nurses Credentialing Center (ANCC). This serves as the ultimate distinction for high quality patient care delivery and nursing excellence globally. KFSH-D’s Magnet survey was conducted and the accreditation was attained in the midst of COVID-19 pandemic in March 2020.  KFSH-D is the 3rd hospital in the Kingdom to gain this prestigious recognition and the 6th in the Gulf Region.

Accreditations and Certifications 

 Central Board of Accreditation for Healthcare Institutions (CBAHI) - (1st Accreditation : 2017. Re-accreditation: 2020)
 Joint Commission International (JCI) - (1st Accreditation: 2010, Re-accreditations : 2013, 2016, 2019)
 Collage of American Pathologists (CAP) – (1st Accreditation: 2011, Re-accreditations: 2013,2015,2017,2019)
 American Association of Blood Bank (AABB) – (1st Accreditation: 2013, Re-accreditations: 2015, 2018)
 American Society for Histocompatibility and Immunogen tics (ASHI) - (1st Accreditation: 2012, Re-accreditations: 2014, 2016, 2018, 2020)
 American College of Radiology (ACR) Breast Imaging Center of Excellence (1st Accreditation: 2014, Re-accreditations: 2016)
 American College of Radiology (ACR) for CT - (1st Accreditation: 2016, Re-accreditations: 2020)
 The Laboratory Accreditation Board of ABRET- for Epilepsy Monitoring Program 2016
 The Laboratory Accreditation Board of ABRET - for EEG Laboratory (2020)
 Association for the Accreditation of Human Research Protection Program (AAHRPP) - (1st Accreditation: 2013, Re-accreditations: 2017)
 ISO14001:2015 environmental management system (1st Accreditation: 2020)
 ISO45001:2018 occupational health and safety (OH&S) management system (1st Accreditation: 2020)
 ISO41001:2018 facility management (FM) system (1st Accreditation: 2020)
 ISO9001:2015 quality management system (1st Accreditation: 2020)
 ISO 22000:2018 Food Safety Management System (1st Accreditation: 2018)
 ISO 27000 of Information Security Management System (1st Accreditation: 2019)
 Magnet (granted by the American Nurses Credentialing Center (ANCC) for best nursing care)- (1st accreditation: 2020)
 European Society for Medical Oncology (ESMO) – (1st Accreditation: 2019)
 King Abdulaziz Quality Award (KAQA) – Silver ranking in 2019

Collaboration agreements 
KFSH-D has developed, over a very short time, several joint collaborative agreements with hospitals and health centers in North America and Europe. On the regional level, similar joint agreements have been achieved with Saudi and Arab universities.
International
 Roswell Park Comprehensive Cancer Center
 Nebraska Medical Center
 University of California , San Diego
 St. Jude Children's Research Hospital
 The Children's Hospital of Philadelphia
 University of Alabama at Birmingham
 Rehabilitation Institute of Michigan
 Calgary Laboratory Services
 University Health Network
 The Research Institute McGill University Health Center
 Arab Gulf University
National
 King Fahd University of Petroleum & Minerals
 Prince Mohammad bin Fahd University
 King Saud University
 Al Ghad International Colleges for Health Sciences
 Dammam University
 Saudi Arabian Cultural Mission in USA

Medical staff, training, and research 
The hospital has been recognized by the Saudi Council for Health Specialties (SCFHS) as a center of specialized training in multiple medical and allied health programs. Medical scholars from Arab neighboring countries are also trained in KFSH-D to become diplomat of Saudi Board and/or Arab Board in different specialties. The Research Administration was first established in January 2010; the IRB (Institutional Review Board) reviews and approves submitted research proposals in the area of clinical research with a vision to expand to the basic research as well.

See also
List of hospitals in Saudi Arabia
King Fahd Medical City

References
 www.KFSH.med.sa

Hospital buildings completed in 1999
Hospitals in Saudi Arabia
Dammam
1999 establishments in Saudi Arabia